The Panasonic Lumix DMC-FZ300 (also known as the Panasonic Lumix DMC-FZ330) is a constant-aperture DSLR-styled digital bridge camera announced by Panasonic on July 16, 2015. It succeeds the Panasonic Lumix DMC-FZ200.

Panasonic Lumix DMC-FZ330 with opticals components and other filters

Close-up Raynox

Hoya CPL

Hoya ND filters

References
http://www.dpreview.com/products/panasonic/slrs/panasonic_dmcfz300/specifications

FZ300
Superzoom cameras